David Lively (born 27 June 1953) is a French classical pianist of US origin.

Biography 
Born in Ironton, Ohio, Lively began his career at the age of 14 playing Khachatourian's Piano Concerto with the St. Louis Symphony.

In 1972 he won fourth place in the Queen Elisabeth Competition. He later participated, as a member of the jury of the same competition, in the 1999, 2003 and 2010 editions.

He currently heads the Saint-Lizier festival in the Ariège department.

He is the Director of the École normale de musique de Paris competitions.

Discography 
 César Franck: Complete Chamber music
 Albert Huybrechts: Chamber music
 Joseph Marx: The two concertos at ASV Records
 Philippe Boesmans: Complete work for piano
 Aaron Copland: Work for piano 
 Johannes Brahms: Sonata in F minor, Op 5, Ballades Op 10
 Rachmaninov's Piano Concertos in C minor N° 2 and N° 3
 Bach's The Art of Fugue
 Gabriel Fauré: Complete Nocturnes
 Furtwängler's Piano Concerto
 Liszt's Piano Concerto No. 1, Hungarian Fantasy
 Ravel's Le Tombeau de Couperin, Stravinski's  Petrushka (ballet), Tango, Piano-Rag-Music at Deutsch Grammophon

See also

References

External links 
  (Official website)
 Biography (Les Concerts Parisiens)
 David Lively (École Normale Cortot)
 David Lively (France Musique)
 David Lively piano (Bach Cantatas Website)
 Voyage dans l'univers intemporel du pianiste David Lively (Le Figaro)
 Discography (Discogs)
 David Lively plays Ravel, Le Tombeau de Couperin (YouTube)

1953 births
21st-century French male classical pianists
American classical pianists
American male pianists
École Normale de Musique de Paris alumni
Living people
People from Ironton, Ohio
Prize-winners of the Queen Elisabeth Competition
American emigrants to France